Doctor Hudson Hornet, MD (also known as The Fabulous Hudson Hornet, Hud, Doc Hudson, or simply Doc) is an animated, anthropomorphic retired race car which appears in the 2006 Pixar film Cars as a medical doctor and a local judge. He is voiced by actor Paul Newman in the first and third films (the latter via unused audio recordings) and the video game, and Corey Burton in all other media. Six-time Turismo Carretera champion Juan María Traverso voiced the character in the Rioplatense Spanish version of the first film. He is modeled after a 1951 Hudson Hornet.

Character
Doc Hudson (voiced by Paul Newman in his last non-documentary film role and in his only animated film role) was Radiator Springs' local physician. His license plate read 51HHMD which was a reference to his year and track number (51), model (Hudson Hornet) and profession (medical doctor). A racer-turned-mechanic, the character had Newman's blue eyes.

Hudson's stickers said "twin H power" which was an optional dealer-installed dual carburetor intake manifold, with twin 1-barrel carburetors and air filters. It was a dealer-installed option in '51 and then a factory option on 1952 model Hornets. Hudson was once known as the Fabulous Hudson Hornet (#51), one of the most famous race cars that ever lived. He won three consecutive Piston Cups (1951/1952/1953) and he still held the record for most wins in a single season (27, also the number of NASCAR Grand National races won by Hudson Hornets in 1952). His career, however, unexpectedly came to an end when he suffered a horrifying crash on the track during the final lap of the 1954 Fireball Beach 350, putting him out for the season. The story that closely parallels the fate of Herb Thomas, NASCAR's 1951 and 1953 champion. Upon his return, Hudson discovered that racing had moved on without him, as he had been replaced by a rookie. He kept a newspaper article on the career-ending crash as a reminder to never return to the life that had been taken away from him.

Jaded by the racing scene, he left that world, apparently taking out time to study medicine. The famous No. 51 disappeared into obscurity, leaving many wondering where he went. He instead opted for a simple navy blue paint job and the life of a physician in the tiny town of Radiator Springs, the "shining Gemstone" of the Mother Road – U.S. Route 66. He ran Doc's Clinic as a "doctor of internal combustion". As times changed and the town was bypassed by Interstate 40, Hudson stayed on, even when the population dwindled to a meager dozen residents. He was respected, well-loved, and served not only as the town's physician, but also as its judge. Nobody in the town had any idea of his past as a racer, knowing him merely as an ordinary Hudson Hornet and he used his Piston Cup trophies to hold his tools instead of putting them on display.
 

Upon meeting the rookie race car Lightning McQueen after he got arrested for destroying the town's main street by accident, Hudson saw far too much of the past that he left behind. He originally wanted McQueen out but decided to sentence him to community service by having him fix the road as punishment. At one point, Hudson challenged McQueen to a race, which McQueen lost by falling off and hitting a cactus due to his lack of knowledge of dirt racing. His one token attempt to explain a controlled skid on an abrupt turn in dirt-track racing to McQueen was met with misunderstanding and skepticism, leaving Hudson disillusioned and bitter about the young hot rod who seemed to care only about himself.

He was less than happy when an amazed McQueen discovered his past and asked, "How could a car like you quit at the top of your game?" Hudson bitterly admitted that he did not quit, but was forced into retirement after his crash by the rise of hot young racers. "There was a lot left in me," Hudson said sadly, "I never got the chance to show them." After McQueen finished fixing the Radiator Springs road that he damaged when arriving in town as part of Hudson's court ruling, McQueen decided to stay in town for one extra day, but Hudson was unable to bear having him around any longer and called the news and press, prompting McQueen to immediately leave for the Piston Cup championship race in California. After being scolded by Sally for revealing McQueen's location and making him leave out of his dislike of him, Hudson realizes that McQueen became more important to them than he thought since he helped them restore the town to its former glory just as they had helped him change his ways and began to regret his actions; he believed the town would be happier without McQueen, but was proven wrong. Eventually, he not only admitted to the townsfolk that he was the Fabulous Hudson Hornet, but took back his #51 racing colors to become McQueen's pit crew chief. Nearly the entire town travelled to California as McQueen's pit crew and cheering section. At the race, the commentators recognized his presence on the cameras and Hudson finally received a long-overdue acknowledgment for his return. During the final lap of the race, McQueen uses an old trick he learned from Hudson, which immediately puts a smile on Hudson's face and it shows he truly learned something from him, to take the lead. When McQueen chose to help an injured Strip Weathers (whom he did not want to suffer the same misfortune Hudson did) finish his last race instead of winning the Piston Cup, which is won by an egotistical Chick Hicks (who ends up being pelted and stoned by the media and fans for what he did to Weathers as well as cheating), he smiled once more and expressed how proud he was of McQueen for doing what's right rather than what's important to him.

At the end of the film, Hudson kept his racing colours, becoming a trainer and mentor as well as a friend to the young McQueen. Just like McQueen, Hudson learned some lessons: friendship, promises, how greed affects others, and that secrets simply can't be hidden forever. When a racing museum subsequently opened in Radiator Springs, one entire wing was devoted to his racing career (with many of Hudson's racing equipment and piston cups on display). Much as Junior #8 acknowledged to "The King" that "you've been an inspiration to me", The King indicated "the Hudson Hornet was my inspiration". Together, McQueen and Hudson won four consecutive Piston Cups.

In the video game taking place after the first Cars film, he taught McQueen powerslide lessons and became the crew chief for McQueen during the Piston Cup season in the game's story mode. He was also a playable character who could be purchased by 5,000 points. Though during the game's story mode, he wore his original blue paint job and white wheels when racing McQueen or training him, but his original racing colours along with his red wheels could also be purchased.

In Cars 2, Hudson died before the events of the film (his voice actor, Paul Newman, died in 2008) and the Piston Cup was renamed in his honour, with his clinic being converted into a museum that displayed trophies and mementos from his career. 

John Lasseter announced that Cars 3 would include a tribute to Hudson. McQueen's crash in the teaser was a reference to Hudson's accident and he often recalled pieces of advice that Hudson gave him in flashbacks. McQueen went to Hudson's old trainer, Smokey in Thomasville, Georgia for help and watched movies of Hudson's old races for inspiration. Smokey also explained that training McQueen, not racing, was the most enjoyable part of Hudson's life. At the end, McQueen adopted Hudson's old racing colours and painted "The Fabulous Lightning McQueen" on himself in honor of Hudson, "The Fabulous Hudson Hornet." McQueen's bumper also read, "For Doc Hudson". Cruz Ramirez, a trainer who subsequently started a racing career of her own, take on Hudson's old number of 51 as a second tribute.

Background

The car is based on the real-life Fabulous Hudson Hornet in NASCAR competition, with Hudson's racing career most closely resembling that of Herb Thomas, the record holder for highest career win rate (55 of 228 races, or 21.05%), and the first ever two-time champion.

Paul Newman, a racing enthusiast and former driver, drew upon his experiences for the grumpy old race car's personality. The character has strong parallels to the Doc Hollywood of a 1991 film and shares the "Doc" moniker with the late Walter "Doc" Mason, interviewed on Route 66 as research for the film.

A close friend of Michael Wallis (the voice of "Sheriff"), country veterinarian Dr. Walter S. Mason Jr. owned the Tradewinds Courtyard Inn from 1963 until 2003 and donated land for the Oklahoma Route 66 Museum in Clinton. Doc Mason died in June 2007 after a lengthy battle with Alzheimer's disease. After his demise the inn, which once hosted Elvis Presley went into a steep decline, losing its Best Western membership and receiving many highly-negative reviews.

The original Hudson Hornet was introduced in 1951 and manufactured until 1954.  Built around a 5.0L, 6 cylinder inline engine with (starting in 1952) twin carburetors on a very low body and centre of gravity, the Hornet was essentially a racing car with the veneer of a luxury sedan.  Fabulous Hudson Hornets won NASCAR cups for three consecutive years (Herb Thomas in 1951 and 1953, and Tim Flock in 1952), paralleling Doc Hudson's three Piston Cup wins in those same years. The Hudson Motor Company was merged into Nash Motors on January 14, 1954, to form American Motors Corporation (AMC). After brief use as a marque on Nash-designed AMC vehicles, the Hudson name was discontinued after the 1957 model year. The automaker particitated in a variety of motor sport venues that included five NASCAR wins with its AMC Matador between 1973 and 1975. Chrysler acquired AMC in 1987.

The "Fabulous Hudson Hornet" name, which appeared on three famous NASCAR entries between 1951 and 1954, vanished once Hudson was merged into AMC. Herb Thomas #92 raced Buick and Chevrolet cars in 1955; severe injuries in a 1956 racing wreck in Shelby effectively ended his career, despite two unsuccessful starts in 1957 and one in 1962. Tim Flock #91 switched to Ford cars in 1955; he was one of two drivers forced out of NASCAR after supporting a 1961 unionisation attempt, the Federation of Professional Athletes. Marshall Teague #6 left NASCAR after the 1952 season in a dispute with NASCAR's owner Bill France, Sr.; he was killed in a  rollover collision at Daytona on 11 February 1959.

Doc Hudson does not appear in Cars 2 as his voice actor Paul Newman died from lung cancer on September 26, 2008. Pixar eventually decided having Doc appear in Cars 2 would not be a good idea. A conversation between McQueen and Mater indicates that Doc died before the second film. Doc's memory lives on, as the Piston Cup was renamed after him. During the Japan leg of the World Grand Prix, one of the commentators notes that Doc was one of the best dirt-track racers of all time.

Herb Thomas' 1952 Fabulous Hudson Hornet is currently displayed in the Ypsilanti Automotive Heritage Museum in Michigan; Tim Flock's car is in the Memory Lane Museum in Mooresville, North Carolina. Herb Thomas entered NASCAR's hall of fame for 2013 as the first to win two NASCAR premier series championships (1951 and 1953). A replica of Teague's car is owned by Bruce and Patty Teeters (Teague's descendants).

References

External links
 

Cars (franchise) characters
Fictional characters from Arizona
Fictional physicians
Fictional judges
Fictional racing cars
Fictional racing drivers
Doc Hudson
Film characters introduced in 2006
Male characters in film
Male characters in animated films
Animated characters introduced in 2006
Fictional people from the 20th-century